Schismus is a genus of African and Eurasian plants in the grass family. Two species are naturalized in North America, where they are known as Mediterranean grass.

 Species
 Schismus arabicus - Greece, North Africa, East Africa, Asia (from Saudi Arabia to Xinjiang); naturalized in scattered locations in Australia, United States, Mexico, Chile, Argentina
 Schismus barbatus - Mediterranean and neighboring regions (from Canary Islands to Tibet); South Africa; naturalized in scattered locations in Australia, United States, Mexico, Chile, Argentina
 Schismus inermis - South Africa
 Schismus scaberrimus - South Africa
 Schismus schismoides - South Africa, Namibia

 Formerly included
see Deschampsia Disakisperma Tribolium 
 Schismus gouanii - Deschampsia media
 Schismus patens - Disakisperma dubium
 Schismus pleuropogon - Tribolium pleuropogon
 Schismus villarsii - Deschampsia media

References

Danthonioideae
Grasses of Africa
Grasses of Asia
Poaceae genera